The Korean Register (KR) is a not-for-profit classification society founded in South Korea offering verification and certification services for ships and marine structures in terms of design, construction and maintenance.  Founded in 1960, the society employs 889 people.  Its headquarters in Busan and it has 66 offices worldwide.

KRS is a full member of the International Association of Classification Societies (IACS) which is the trade association of major global classification societies.

References

External links 
 

Business organizations based in South Korea
Ship classification societies
Organizations established in 1960
Companies based in Busan